Ebro is a river in Spain.

Ebro may also refer to:

 Ebro, Florida
 Ebro, Minnesota
 Ebro trucks, a Spanish truck brand
 Ebro Darden, a disc jockey on New York's WQHT (Hot 97) radio station
 CD Ebro, a Spanish football club in Zaragoza
 RMS Ebro, a 1914 ocean liner

See also
 Battle of the Ebro